Persekap stands for Persatuan Sepakbola Kota Pasuruan (en: Football Association of Pasuruan City). Persekap Pasuruan is an Indonesian football club based in Pasuruan, East Java. They play in Liga 3.

Honours 
Liga Indonesia First Division
 Champions: 2011-12

References

External links
 

Pasuruan
Football clubs in East Java
Football clubs in Indonesia
Association football clubs established in 1926
1926 establishments in the Dutch East Indies